The One Hundred Thirty-Fourth Ohio General Assembly was a meeting of the Ohio state legislature, composed of the Ohio Senate and the Ohio House of Representatives.  It convened in Columbus, Ohio on January 4, 2021 and adjourned on December 31, 2022.  The apportionment of legislative districts was based on the 2010 United States census and 2011 redistricting plan.  The Ohio Republican Party retained the majority in both the Ohio Senate and Ohio House of Representatives.

Party summary 
Resignations and new members are discussed in the "Changes in membership" section, below.

Senate

House of Representatives

Leadership

Senate 

 Senate President: Matt Huffman
 President Pro Tempore: Jay Hottinger

 Majority (Republican) leadership 

 Majority Floor Leader: Kirk Schuring
 Majority Whip: Rob McColley

 Minority (Democratic) leadership

 Senate Minority Leader: Kenny Yuko
 Assistant Minority Leader: Cecil Thomas
 Minority Whip: Nickie Antonio
 Assistant Minority Whip: Tina Maharath

House of Representatives 

 Speaker of the House: Robert Cupp
 Speaker Pro Tempore: Tim Ginter

 Majority (Republican) leadership 

 Majority Floor Leader: Bill Seitz
 Assistant Majority Floor Leader: Rick Carfagna
 Majority Whip: Don Jones
 Assistant Majority Whip: Cindy Abrams

 Minority (Democratic) leadership

 House Minority Leader: Allison Russo
 Assistant Minority Leader: Thomas West
 Minority Whip: Jessica Miranda
 Assistant Minority Whip: Richard Brown

Membership

Senate

House of Representatives

Changes in membership

Senate

House of Representatives

Committees 
Listed alphabetically by chamber, including Chairperson and Ranking Member.

Senate

House of Representatives

Joint Committees

See also 

 List of Ohio state legislatures

References 

Ohio legislative sessions
2021 U.S. legislative sessions
2022 U.S. legislative sessions
2021 in Ohio